Stadio Tommaso Fattori is a multi-use stadium in L'Aquila, Italy.  It is currently used mostly for football and rugby union matches and the home of L'Aquila Calcio and L'Aquila Rugby. Inaugurated in 1933, the stadium holds 10,000 people.

It hosted some of the football preliminaries for the 1960 Summer Olympics.

See also

List of rugby league stadiums by capacity
List of rugby union stadiums by capacity

References
1960 Summer Olympics official report. Volume 1. p. 86.

Venues of the 1960 Summer Olympics
Olympic football venues
Tommaso Fattori
Rugby union stadiums in Italy
Buildings and structures in L'Aquila
Buildings and structures completed in 1933
Tommaso Fattori